Joymax is a South Korean video game developer. Joymax initially published games for the PC then expanded to other platforms (including mobile devices). Joymax runs a data center in the United Kingdom and a customer service center in the Philippines. They are the creators of Silkroad Online and Karma Online. They also hosted the English version of Digimon Masters until 2016.

Games

Available

References

External links
Official English Website
Official Korean Website

South Korean companies established in 2004
Companies based in Seoul
Video game companies established in 2004
Video game companies of South Korea
Video game development companies
Video game publishers